Bob Deig is a former Democratic member of the Indiana Senate, representing the 49th District.

External links
 State Senator Bob Deig official Indiana State Legislature site

 

Democratic Party Indiana state senators
1961 births
Living people
Politicians from Evansville, Indiana